Assem el Gazzar (born 20 August 1967) is the current Minister of housing in the cabinet headed by Mostafa Madbouly.

el Gazzar was appointed as the Deputy Housing Minister on January 2018. He was sworn in as the minister of housing as a successor to Prime Minister Mostafa Madbouly.

References

 

1967 births
Housing ministers of Egypt
Egyptian engineers
Living people
Cairo University alumni
21st-century Egyptian politicians